Athrips falkovitshi is a moth of the family Gelechiidae. It is found in Turkmenistan and Uzbekistan. The habitat consists of deserts.

The wingspan is 11–12 mm. The forewings are light grey or cream, with some weakly raised scales with brown tips and two small ochreous brown spots near the base, two larger distinct spots in the middle and two spots at two-thirds. The hindwings are light grey. Adults are on wing from the end of April to early June.

The larvae feed on the leaves of Peganum harmala from within a silken tube made on a small twig. The larvae have a light grey body and black head.

References

Moths described in 1990
Athrips
Moths of Asia